Sireh may refer to:

Sireh-ye Olya
Sireh-ye Sofla